Armin Alesevic (born 6 March 1994) is a Swiss footballer who currently plays as a centre back.

Club career

Born in Glarus, Alesevic is a youth exponent form FC Zurich. He made his Swiss Super League debut at 18 May 2013 against FC Luzern. He played the full game, which ended in a 4–1 home win.

Personal life
Alesevic is of Bosnian descent.

References

1994 births
Living people
Swiss men's footballers
Swiss people of Bosnia and Herzegovina descent
Swiss Super League players
FC Zürich players
Association football defenders
People from Glarus